An Academic Question is a novel by Barbara Pym, written in the early 1970s and published posthumously in 1986.

Synopsis
Caroline 'Caro' Grimstone is the wife of a sociology professor in a small West Country university town. While her husband is fascinated by dinner parties discussing African anthropology and minor academic points, Caro is growing tired of her dull village and her pale marriage, as well as their unpleasant 4-year-old daughter. A dying missionary, Reverend Stillingfleet, ends up in a  nearby nursing home, and Caro's husband Alan realises that Stillingfleet possesses an unpublished manuscript on their shared field of anthropology. Concerned that the manuscript will be lost - or worse bequeathed to a rival - Alan convinces Caro to steal the manuscript, allowing him to write a groundbreaking paper.

Caro begins to regret the theft, as well as developing suspicions that Alan is having an affair with his attractive editor. She seeks out the guidance of her friends Kitty, a self-absorbed English woman who has spent much of her adult life in the Caribbean, Kitty's effete, gossipy son Coco, and her sister Dolly, a spinster who cares for a large family of hedgehogs in her back garden. Ultimately, Caro is able to reconcile her marriage with Alan when he comes to regret his affair. The manuscript, which has caused so much chaos, is destroyed in a library fire accidentally started by protesting students.

Publication history
Pym commenced writing the novel in 1970 and completed the first draft in 1971. Pym's last novel had been published in 1961, and she had been rejected by publishers since. At the time, Pym had no expectations for her "academic novel", writing "[p]erhaps my immediate circle of friends will like to read it". Pym wanted the novel to be "a sort of Margaret Drabble effort"  however she was ultimately dissatisfied with the novel. She put it aside and never returned to revise the work.

Pym left two drafts of An Academic Question, one in the first-person narrative and one in third person. After Pym's death, her literary executor Hazel Holt revised the work from a combination of the two drafts for publication. The novel was published posthumously in 1986, by Macmillan in England and E. P. Dutton in the United States. The novel was released as an audiobook in the 1980s by Chivers Press, read by Angela Pleasence. The novel was published in Germany in 1991 as Die Frau des Professors (The Professor's Wife), in France in 1992 as Une Question Purement Académique, and in Italy in 2019 as Una questione accademica.

Reception
The novel received mixed reviews, with most acknowledging its status as a draft. Kirkus Reviews called it "minor but still intriguing... on occasion, deliriously funny". The New York Times called the novel "one of Pym's paler efforts" but noted that Pym remained "one of the most engaging novelists of this century".

Connections to other works
Pym's novels routinely feature characters from her previous works. The characters of Sister Dew from An Unsuitable Attachment and Digby Fox from Less than Angels reappear. Most notably, this novel features the memorial service for Esther Clovis, a character who had appeared in three previous Pym novels starting with Excellent Women. The memorial service is seen from the point of view of Caro Grimstone, who did not know Miss Clovis and thus is attempting to piece together the woman's personality from the details of her service. The memorial service will be seen a second time, from a different perspective, in Pym's final novel A Few Green Leaves.

References

1986 British novels
Novels by Barbara Pym
Novels published posthumously
Macmillan Publishers books